Abraham B. Rafie is an American politician who served for one term as a Republican member of the Kansas House of Representatives, from 2017 to 2018. He represented the 48th District in the Kansas House, residing in Overland Park, Kansas. 

In addition to his time in the state legislature, Rafie worked as a diagnostic radiologist.

References

Living people
Year of birth missing (living people)
Republican Party members of the Kansas House of Representatives
Politicians from Overland Park, Kansas
21st-century American politicians